Brigasc is a dialect of the Ligurian language. It is spoken in Italy and France.

Area of use

The Brigasc dialect is spoken in La Brigue (France) and Briga Alta (Italy) and some villages of the communes of Ormea and Triora. It is very close to Royasc dialect.

History
During the Renaissance the Ligurian language was spoken in all the territories of the Republic of Genoa: in the western area of this republic one of its groups (spoken mainly in the area between the Principality of Monaco and Sanremo) was called Intemelio.

The language spoken in the mountains around Briga was called Brigasc and received some influence from the Occitan language.

Some words in Brigasc

See also

Mentonasque
Intemelio
Ligurian language

References

Bibliography

 Fiorenzo Toso, Il brigasco e l'olivettese tra classificazione scientifica e manipolazioni politico-amministrative, in Intemelion. Cultura e territorio – Quaderno annuale di studi storici dell'Accademia di cultura intemelia, n. 14, anno 2008; website online (in Italian)

External links
 Magazine in Brigasc R^ Ní d'áigüra (Italian:Il nido dell'aquila)
 "Terra brigasca" website

Languages of France
Ligurian language (Romance)